Raine J. Peltokoski is a Finnish sport shooter who has won the IPSC European Rifle Championship three times (2009, 2012, 2015 ), and the IPSC European Shotgun Championship once (2006). He is sponsored by Lapua ammunition and Armi Dallera Custom rifles. He also has 7 Finnish Rifle Championship gold medals (2006, 2008, 2009, 2011, 2012, 2014 and 2015), one silver medal (2007) and one bronze medal (2005).

Raine started competing actively in 1989, and took his first Finnish championship title in the Modified division at the 1993 IPSC Finnish Handgun Championship. He focused on pistol and shotgun competitions until 2005, when he also started to focus on the rifle discipline. From 2010 to 2012 he continuously led the Finnish practical shooting rankings with full 100% results in both Open pistol, Open rifle and Standard shotgun.

See also 
 Teemu Rintala, Finnish sport shooter
 Josh Froelich, American sport shooter

References 

IPSC shooters
Finnish male sport shooters
Living people
Year of birth missing (living people)